McNamee is a surname of Irish origin. The original Gaelic version, Mac Conmidhe means "Son of the hound of Meath".

McNamee may refer to :

Anthony McNamee (b. 1983), English footballer
Bernie McNamee, the co-host of The World at Six, the Canadian Broadcasting Corporation
Brian McNamee, former New York City police officer, personal trainer, and strength and conditioning coach in Major League Baseball
Danny McNamee (b. 1960) electronic engineer from Northern Ireland, convicted of terrorist bomb-making offences but later acquitted after 10 years imprisonment
David McNamee (b. 1980), Scottish footballer
Eoin McNamee (Kilkeel, County Down, 1961), Irish writer
Eoin McNamee (Irish republican), IRA chief of staff
Frank McNamee (1906–1968), Justice of the Supreme Court of Nevada
Graham McNamee (1888–1942), broadcaster in American radio
Jessica McNamee (born 1986), Australian actress
Joe McNamee (born 1926), retired American professional basketball player
John McNamee (born 1941), Scottish footballer
Luke McNamee (187 –1952), American admiral and Governor of Guam
Penny McNamee (1983-) Australian actress
Pat McNamee, nationalist politician in Northern Ireland
Peter McNamee (ice hockey) (born 1950), Canadian ice hockey forward
Peter McNamee (footballer) (born 1935), Scottish footballer
Paul McNamee (born 1954), retired Australian tennis player and prominent sports administrator
Ray McNamee (1895–1949), Australian cricketer
Roger McNamee, founding partner of the venture capital firm Elevation Partners
Ruth McNamee (1921–2016), American politician
William McNamee (1891–1935), Scottish footballer